Middle Clyde River is a community  in the Canadian province of Nova Scotia, located in the Municipality of the District of Barrington of Shelburne County.

In 1875, Middle Clyde River had a population of 75, and was the home of "1 church and 3 saw mills".

See also
 List of communities in Nova Scotia

References

External links
Middle Clyde River on Destination Nova Scotia

Communities in Shelburne County, Nova Scotia
General Service Areas in Nova Scotia